The 2010 FC Sibir Novosibirsk season was the clubs first, and only, season in the Russian Premier League, the highest tier of football in Russia. They finished the season in 16th position and were relegated back to the Russian First Division after one season. Sibir were also defeated by Spartak Moscow in the 2010–11 Russian Cup at the Round of 16 stage, and by PSV Eindhoven in the Play-off round of the 2010–11 UEFA Europa League.

Squad

Reserve squad

Transfers

Winter

In:

Note: footballers transferred from Sibir-LFC (amateur level farm team) are not listed.

Out:

Summer

In:

Out:

Competitions

Russian Premier League

Results summary

Results

League table

Russian Cup

Round 16 took place during the 2011–12 season.

UEFA Europa League

Qualifying rounds

Squad statistics

Appearances and goals

|-
|colspan="14"|Players who left Sibir Novosibirsk during the season:

|}

Goal Scorers

Disciplinary record

References

FC Sibir Novosibirsk
Sibir Novosibirsk